Don Snow (born 13 January 1957 in London) is a British vocalist and multi-instrumentalist, who plays the Hammond organ, piano, guitar, bass guitar, drums and saxophone. He is primarily known for his work with the new wave bands Squeeze, the Sinceros and the Catch, as well as Procol Harum. He has also frequently toured with Van Morrison and has played the Hammond organ and piano on three of his albums.

Career
He started his career in 1978 as an original member of the new wave/power pop outfit the Sinceros, who were signed to Epic Records and released a string of successful albums. Around this time, he also played with Lene Lovich and Bill Nelson, before he joined Squeeze in 1982, replacing Paul Carrack. At this time, he recorded with drummer Chris Whitten as the Catch, releasing the single "25 Years" which reached number 3 on the German charts, sold half a million copies and stayed on the charts for 40 weeks. He also recorded with artists such as Judie Tzuke, Tracey Ullman, Nik Kershaw, ABC and Sheila Walsh.

In 1987, he joined Tina Turner for her Break Every Rule World Tour and recorded the album Live in Europe. He also recorded with Roger Daltrey, Tom Jones, Jimmy Somerville, Chris Eaton, Holly Johnson, Boy George, Jaki Graham and Gary Moore. On 11 June 1988, Snow played the first Nelson Mandela benefit at the Wembley Arena along with Al Green, Joe Cocker, Natalie Cole, Jonathan Butler, Freddie Jackson, and Ashford & Simpson.

In 1990, Snow played with the John Lennon tribute band in Liverpool, before he re-joined Squeeze in 1991 for touring. In 1992, after appearing on records by Tina Turner, Judie Tzuke, Thomas Anders and Heartland, he played keyboards for Procol Harum and later played for Van Morrison. He joined Squeeze for the third time in 1995 and played with Morrison again in 1998.

Since 2000, he has recorded releases with Kylie Minogue, Melanie C, Joe Cocker, Mark Owen, Michael Ball and released several solo albums.

In December 1992, he changed his name to Jonn Savannah.

Discography

Album credits
 1978 – Lene Lovich – Stateless
 1979 – The Sinceros – The Sound of Sunbathing
 1979 – The Barron Knights – Tell the World to Laugh
 1979 – Peter C. Johnson – Peter C. Johnson
 1980 – Johnny Logan – Save Me
 1980 – The Vibrators – Batteries Included
 1981 – The Sinceros – Pet Rock
 1981 – The Quick – Ship to Shore
 1981 – The Sinceros – 2nd Debut
 1981 – Fingerprintz – Beat Noir
 1982 – Jona Lewie – Heart Skips Beat
 1982 – Judie Tzuke – Shoot the Moon
 1982 – Squeeze – Sweets from a Stranger
 1982 – Fern Kinney – All It Takes Love to Know Love
 1983 – Wendy & the Rocketts – Dazed for Days
 1983 – Bianca – Where the Beat Meets the Street
 1983 – Judie Tzuke – Ritmo
 1983 – Tracey Ullman – They Don't Know
 1984 – The Catch – Balance on Wires
 1984 – Nik Kershaw – The Riddle
 1984 – Nik Kershaw – Human Racing
 1984 – Tracey Ullman – You Caught Me Out
 1984 – Tin Tin – Kiss Me
 1984 – Paul Da Vinci – Work So Hard
 1985 – ABC – How to be a Zillionaire!
 1985 – Gianni Morandi – Uno So Mille
 1985 – Sheila Walsh – Shadowlands
 1987 – The Catch – Walk the Water
 1987 – Roger Daltrey – Can't Wait to See the Movie
 1987 – Model – Model
 1987 – Chris Eaton – Vision
 1988 – Tina Turner – Live in Europe
 1989 – Holly Johnson – Blast
 1989 – Jimmy Somerville – Ready My Lips
 1989 – Tom Jones – At This Moment
 1989 – Gary Moore – Wild Frontier
 1989 – Jaki Graham – From Now On
 1989 – Baby Ford – Beach Bump
 1991 – Thomas Anders – Whispers
 1991 – Tina Turner – Simply the Best
 1991 – Judie Tzuke – Left Hand Talking
 1991 – Heartland – Heartland
 1991 – This Picture – A Violent Impression
 1992 – Judie Tzuke – I Can Read Books
 1993 – Van Morrison – Too Long in Exile
 1994 – Van Morrison – A Night in San Francisco
 1994 – Hanne Boel – Misty Paradise
 1994 – Gregory Gray – Euroflake in Silverlake
 1995 – Brian Kennedy – Intuition
 1995 – Martyn Joseph – Martyn Joseph
 1995 – Jimmy Somerville – Dare to Love
 1995 – Van Morrison – Days Like This
 1996 – Ray Charles – Strong Love Affair
 1996 – Squeeze – Ridiculous
 1996 – Right Said Fred – Smashing!
 1996 – Judie Tzuke – Under the Angels
 1997 – The Vibrators – Demos & Raities
 1999 – Joe Cocker – No Ordinary World
 1999 – Ashley Maher – The Blessed Rain
 1999 – Siggi – Siggi
 1999 – Emmet Swimming – Big Night Without You
 2000 – Kylie Minogue – Light Years
 2000 – Ruth – Ruth
 2001 – Russell Watson – The Voice
 2001 – Steve Balsamo – All I Am
 2003 – Melanie C – Reason
 2003 – American Idol – Season 2
 2003 – Ruben Studdard – Superstar
 2003 – Sandi Russell – Incascedent
 2004 – American Idol – Season 3
 2004 – Mark Owen – In Your Own Time
 2005 – Bernie Armstrong – The Face of Christ
 2006 – Heavy Little Elephants – Heavy Little Elephants
 2006 – Michael Ball – One Voice
 2007 – Pawnshop Roses – Let It Roll
 2009 – Carsie Blanton – Carsie Blanton
 2009 – Alcaz – On Se Dit Tout
 2010 – Alexis Cunningham – Wonderlust
 2011 – Alexis Cunningham – Love at the End of the World
 2014 – Die Fantastischen Vier (feat. Jonn Savannah) – 25

References

External links
Official website
Don Snow' Fan page at procolharum.com

1945 births
Living people
English male singers
English multi-instrumentalists
English record producers
English new wave musicians
Procol Harum members
Squeeze (band) members
English expatriates in the United States
The Vibrators members
The Sinceros members